Clarence Augustus "Gus" Martin (born c. 1955) is an American scholar who specializes in terrorism and juvenile justice.  He is currently a professor at California State University, Dominguez Hills.  He is the father of former National Football League player Jonathan Martin.  He graduated from Harvard University, Duquesne University, and University of Pittsburgh.

Published works
 (2012) Understanding Terrorism: Challenges, Perspectives, and Issues Sage 
 (2010) Terrorism and Homeland Security Sage 
 (2010) Essentials of Terrorism: Concepts and Controversies Sage 
 (2005) Juvenile Justice: Process and Systems Sage 
 (2004) The New Era of Terrorism: Selected Readings Sage

References

1955 births
Living people
Harvard University alumni
Duquesne University alumni
University of Pittsburgh alumni
California State University, Dominguez Hills faculty